Venus Weeping for Adonis is a c.1625 oil on canvas painting by the French painter Nicolas Poussin. Painted after his relocation to Italy it is now part of the collection of the Musée des Beaux-Arts de Caen.

The painting depicts the goddess Venus mourning the death of her mortal lover Adonis after he was gored by a boar whilst hunting. She is pouring nectar onto his wounds after which a scarlet anemone flower would spring up from his blood to his permanent memory. The nearby chariot is reminiscent of Pluto, representing a symbol of death. The two doves perched thereon are attributes of Venus.

The story of Venus and Adonis, as narrated in Ovid's Metamorphoses, was a popular subject in Baroque times as an allegory for death and rebirth and had parallels with the Christian belief in Christ's resurrection. In the painting Adonis' posture is reminiscent of the crucified Christ and Venus' actions akin to those of Saint Mary.

The work found its way into the French royal collection before being sent to Caen.

References

1630 paintings
Mythological paintings by Nicolas Poussin
Paintings based on Metamorphoses
Paintings of Venus